Yamikani Chester (born 20 December 1994) is a Malawian football player who currently plays as a winger.

He represented the Malawi U20s at the 2011 COSAFA U-20 Cup.

Chester played for North Carolina FC in 2019, while on loan from MFK Vyškov.

In December 2019, Chester joined Las Vegas Lights FC of the USL Championship.

References

External links

1994 births
Living people
Las Vegas Lights FC players
Malawian footballers
Malawian expatriate footballers
Mighty Tigers FC players
MFK Vyškov players
North Carolina FC players
Association football midfielders
USL Championship players
Malawi international footballers
Malawian expatriate sportspeople in the United States
Expatriate soccer players in the United States
Malawi under-20 international footballers
2021 Africa Cup of Nations players